JVL may refer to:

Japanese Volleyball League, a professional volleyball league in Japan
JeffVanderLou, St. Louis, a neighborhood of Missouri
Southern Wisconsin Regional Airport, a public airport
Jewish Virtual Library, an online encyclopedia
Jewish Voice for Labour, an organisation for Jewish members of the UK Labour Party
Jonathan V. Last, author and political commentator